Strawberry Hill may refer to:

United Kingdom
Strawberry Hill, London, England
Strawberry Hill House, Horace Walpole's Gothic revival villa
Strawberry Hill railway station

United States
Strawberry Hill (San Francisco), California
Strawberry Hill, Cambridge, Massachusetts
Strawberry Hill (Creagerstown, Maryland)
Strawberry Hill (Edenton, North Carolina)
Strawberry Hill (Enfield, North Carolina)
Strawberry Hill (Kansas City, Kansas)
Strawberry Hill (Rhinebeck, New York)
Strawberry Hill Nature Preserve, Fairfield, Pennsylvania
Strawberry Hill (Petersburg, Virginia)

Other countries
 Strawberry Hill, one of the hills in the Penang Hill group of peaks in Malaysia, and also the name of an historic house there
Strawberry Hill (hotel), a hotel in Jamaica
Strawberry Hill, U.S. Virgin Islands, a settlement on the island of Saint Croix
Old Farm, Strawberry Hill, a heritage listed place in Western Australia

See also
Strawberry Hill Boys
Strawberry Hill Elementary School
Strawberry Hill Estates, Alberta
Strawberry Hill Players
Strawberry Hill Press
Strawberry Hills, New South Wales, an urban locality in Sydney, Australia